John Vaughan (born 26 June 1964) is an English football coach and former professional footballer who was goalkeeping coach at Bradford City.

As a player he was a goalkeeper who made nearly 400 league appearances notably in the Football League with lengthy spells at Fulham, Cambridge United, Preston North End and Lincoln City. He also made brief appearances for Charlton Athletic, Bristol Rovers, Wrexham, Bristol City, Colchester United and Chesterfield.

Playing career
A goalkeeper, Vaughan came up through the youth ranks at West Ham United although he didn't make a first team appearance at Upton Park. Whilst at West Ham he was sent out on loan to gain experience at Charlton Athletic, Bristol Rovers, Wrexham and Bristol City before Fulham paid £12,500 for his permanent services in the summer of 1986. Vaughan spent 2 seasons at Craven Cottage, making 44 league appearances. He was also in goal the night that Liverpool beat Fulham 10–0 in an EFL Cup game.

He was released from Fulham in 1988 and was signed by Cambridge United manager Chris Turner. Vaughan went on to enjoy success at United as, led by Turner's successor John Beck, they gained successive promotions from 1989–91 to take them to the old Second Division. They finished the 1991–92 season in the play-offs for the inaugural Premier League season but were beaten by Leicester City.

During the following season Vaughan fell out of favour once Beck had been sacked and subsequent United managers Ian Atkins and Gary Johnson preferred either Jon Sheffield or John Filan much of the time. At the end of the 1992/93 season Vaughan was released and joined Charlton Athletic where he made 6 appearances as back-up goalkeeper to Bob Bolder.

When John Beck had taken over as manager of Preston North End he took Vaughan with him and he made 66 appearances at Deepdale. Beck was sacked and took over at Lincoln City, taking Vaughan with him again where he played a further 65 games.

He wound down his league career with loan spells at Colchester United and Chesterfield before moving into coaching.

Coaching career
Vaughan went into coaching with clubs such as York City (appointed on a part-time basis in September 2003), Maccesfield Town and Grimsby Town.

After doing some part-time coaching in the academy, Vaughan was appointed as goalkeeping coach at Huddersfield Town in August 2006.
He was goalkeeping coach of Birmingham City from July 2012 to October 2014. In June 2015, he was appointed goalkeeping coach at Barnsley.

In June 2019 he took up the role of goalkeeping coach at Bradford City. The next month he was praised by Bradford City manager Gary Bowyer.

Honours

Club
Cambridge United
 Football League Third Division: 1990–91
 Football League Fourth Division play-off winner: 1989–90

Preston North End
 Football League Division Three: 1995–96

References

External links
Unofficial John Vaughan Profile at The Forgotten Imp

1964 births
Living people
Footballers from Isleworth
English footballers
Association football goalkeepers
West Ham United F.C. players
Charlton Athletic F.C. players
Bristol Rovers F.C. players
Wrexham A.F.C. players
Bristol City F.C. players
Fulham F.C. players
Cambridge United F.C. players
Preston North End F.C. players
Lincoln City F.C. players
Colchester United F.C. players
Chesterfield F.C. players
English Football League players
York City F.C. non-playing staff 
Macclesfield Town F.C. non-playing staff
Grimsby Town F.C. non-playing staff
Huddersfield Town A.F.C. non-playing staff
Birmingham City F.C. non-playing staff
Barnsley F.C. non-playing staff
Bradford City A.F.C. non-playing staff